Rafael 'Rafa' Barber Rodríguez (born 2 October 1980) is a Spanish retired footballer who played as a midfielder.

Club career
Barber was born in Aielo de Malferit, Valencian Community. After making his professional debut with modest clubs (Ontinyent CF and UB Conquense) he joined Andalusia's Recreativo de Huelva for the 2005–06 season, being instrumental in the team's La Liga promotion. He would be put to use in various midfielder positions in the subsequent years, making his debut in the competition on 28 October 2006 in a 3–0 away loss against FC Barcelona.

Barber suffered with some physical problems in 2009–10 campaign, appearing in only 20 out of 42 Segunda División games as Recre failed to return to the top flight. In July 2010, at nearly 30, he signed with another side in that tier and region, Xerez CD.

References

External links

1980 births
Living people
People from Vall d'Albaida
Sportspeople from the Province of Valencia
Spanish footballers
Footballers from the Valencian Community
Association football midfielders
La Liga players
Segunda División players
Segunda División B players
Tercera División players
Valencia CF Mestalla footballers
Ontinyent CF players
UB Conquense footballers
Recreativo de Huelva players
Xerez CD footballers
SD Huesca footballers
Spain youth international footballers